Genetic resources are genetic material of actual or potential value, where genetic material means any material of plant, animal, microbial or other origin containing functional units of heredity.
Genetic resources is one of the three levels of biodiversity defined by the Convention on Biological Diversity in Rio, 1992.

Examples 
Animal genetic resources for food and agriculture
Forest genetic resources
Germplasm, genetic resources that are preserved for various purposes such as breeding, preservation, and research
Plant genetic resources

See also 
Cryoconservation of animal genetic resources, a strategy to preserve genetic resources cryogenically
Commission on Genetic Resources for Food and Agriculture, the only permanent intergovernmental body that addresses biological diversity for food and agriculture
International Treaty on Plant Genetic Resources for Food and Agriculture, an international agreement to promote sustainable use of the world's plant genetic resources
Gene bank, a type of biorepository which preserves genetic material
Genetic diversity
The State of the World's Animal Genetic Resources for Food and Agriculture

References

Genetics
Biodiversity